A South American Championship is a top level international sports competition between South American athletes or sports teams representing their respective countries or professional sports clubs.

List of Championships 
 ATP Buenos Aires, a tennis competition
 Copa América, a football competition formerly known as South American Championship
 FIBA South America Championship for Women
 Men's South American Hockey Championship
 Snipe South American Championship, a sailing competition. 
 Soling South American Championship
 South American Badminton Championships
 South American Basketball Championship
 South American Championships in Athletics
 South American Chess Championship
 South American Cricket Championship
 South American Gymnastics Championships
 South American Men's Club Volleyball Championship
 South American Men's Volleyball Championship
 South American Rugby Championship
 South American Swimming Championships
 South American Women's Football Championship
 South American Women's Volleyball Championship
 South American Youth Championship
 Women's South American Hockey Championship

See also 

 African Championship
 Asian Championship
 European Championship
 List of Pan American Championships
 North American Championship
 Canadian Championships
 Oceanian Championship

References

External links 

Sport in South America